Stepanovskoye is a rural locality (a village) in Sheybukhtovskoye Rural Settlement, Mezhdurechensky District, Vologda Oblast, Russia. The population was 10 as of 2002.

Geography 
Stepanovskoye is located 23 km southwest of Shuyskoye (the district's administrative centre) by road. Nikolskoye is the nearest rural locality.

References 

Rural localities in Mezhdurechensky District, Vologda Oblast